Paul Killick is a British professional ballroom dancer and an International Latin American Dance Champion. He appeared in the first two series of the television show Strictly Come Dancing. Killick specialises in Latin dance and has won international titles including The World Cup, World Trophy, World Masters, World Series, Universal and British Professional Latin American DanceSport Championships. 

Killick is also a choreographer, coach, television personality, dance judge, world-class adjudicator and the owner and director of the Arthur Murray International flagship studio in Beverly Hills.

Professional dance career
Early in his dance career, Killick was invited to join and study at the famous Royal Ballet School in London, but chose instead to pursue competitive Ballroom and Latin American Dancesport.  Killick went on to represent Great Britain in DanceSport throughout the world in the Juvenile, Junior, Youth and Amateur divisions. Killick won the title of World Amateur Latin Champion 1993, dancing with Inga Haas.

In 1994, Killick began dancing professionally with Oksana Forova. In 1996, he began dancing with Vibeke Toft, and they became grand finalists in all major competitions. In October 1998, Killick began dancing with Karina Smirnoff, and again became finalists in all major competitions. This partnership ended in July 1999.

Killick then teamed up with Hanna Karttunen. They danced together for five years and were consistently ranked as one of the best couples in the world. Together they won numerous world titles including United Kingdom Open Champion, International Champion, World Series Champion, World Masters Champion, Dutch Open Champion, United States Open Champion, Asian Open Champion, Kremlin Cup Champion and four time British National Champions.

Killick received the Ballroom Dancers' Federation "Most Outstanding Contribution to Dance" honour in both 1994 and 2004. He has won The World Cup, World Trophy, World Masters, World Series, Universal and British Professional Latin American DanceSport Championships on six occasions. Killick represented Great Britain throughout his career, and has won European, British, United States, Canadian, German, French, Danish, Norwegian, Swedish, Finnish, Austrian, Italian, Dutch, Czechoslovakian, Hungarian, Polish, Scandinavian, Russian and South African Latin American DanceSport Championships before he retired from competitive Latin dancing in 2004.

Killick has also danced for the Royal Families of Monaco, Japan, Denmark, in addition to the Prime Ministers of Germany, Finland, and Russia.

Television, stage and screen
Killick not only played a role in the development and creation of "Strictly Come Dancing" on the BBC in the UK, but he also appeared on seasons one and two of the series, as well as its spin-off, "Strictly Come Dancing: It Takes Two."  In series 1, he danced with Verona Joseph, reaching the fourth round. In series 2, he danced with Carol Vorderman and reached the second round.

Killick choreographed a number of productions for both screen and stage, including "Unforgettable Boleros" with Gloria Estefan, Ricky Martin, Celia Cruz and Ricardo Montalban for PBS; "Stephen Sondheim 75th Birthday Tribute Concert " at the Theatre Royal Drury Lane in London's West End; "An Evening of Ballroom Dancing with Paul Killick" at the Cadogan Theatre in London; and more.

Post retirement

Killick remains active in competitive Ballroom and Latin DanceSport, serving as a world-class adjudicator for a majority of the world's National and International DanceSport competitions. He is a member of the World Dance Council, the National Dance Council of America and the British Dance Council.

Killick was appointed as the Director and owner of the Arthur Murray International flagship studio in Beverly Hills in 2012. Killick serves as both coach and choreographer to many of Ballroom and Latin DanceSport's champions and stars. He also runs his own dance studio in London.

Killick also went on to create worldwide competitive DanceSport events, including The Killick Klassik DanceSport Event in Palm Beach, Florida, The Killick Royale Cup in Beverly Hills, California, The World Pro-Am Stars and The World Challenge DanceSport Championships in Hong Kong.

Killick created The Killick Klassik with International Dance Shoes.

Charity work
As well as his contributions to dance, Killick has also been involved with numerous charities including Childline, Cancer Research UK and Variety Club.

References

External links
Paul Killick official website

British ballroom dancers
British male dancers
Living people
Year of birth missing (living people)